Two Sons of Francisco is a 2005 Brazilian drama film about the lives of the musicians Zezé Di Camargo & Luciano, directed by Breno Silveira.

The film was one of Brazil's most successful in the last twenty years and the biggest box office draw of 2005. The film grossed the equivalent of $13 million worldwide, and a total of $8 million in Brazil, a record for Brazilian cinema.

Until 2008, Dois Filhos de Francisco used to be considered the second biggest audience of a Brazilian film (after the 1976 film Dona Flor and Her Two Husbands). In 2009, the blockbuster Se Eu Fosse Você 2, starring Tony Ramos and Glória Pires, replaced Dois Filhos de Francisco as the second biggest audience among the Brazilian films.

Cast
 Márcio Kieling as Zezé di Camargo
 Thiago Mendonça as Luciano Camargo
 Ângelo Antônio as Seu Francisco Camargo
 Dira Paes as D. Helena Camargo
 Paloma Duarte as Zilú
 José Dumont as Miranda
 Dáblio Moreira as Zezé di Camargo (child)
 Wigor Lima as Luciano (child)
 Marcos Henrique as Emival
 Maria Flor as Solange
 Natália Lage as Cleide
 Jackson Antunes as Zé do Fole
 Pedro as Leonardo
 Thiago as Leandro

Awards and nominations
Havana Film Festival
Audience Award for Best Film – Breno Silveira (won)

Young Artist Awards
Best Performance in an International Feature Film - Leading Young Performer – Marcos Henrique (won, tie)
Best Performance in an International Feature Film - Leading Young Performer – Dablio Moreira (won, tie)
Best International Family Feature Film (nominated)

References

External links
 
 

2005 biographical drama films
2005 films
Brazilian biographical drama films
Biographical films about musicians